Jaishree Misra is an Indian author.

Books

In 2015, Misra's eighth novel A Love Story for My Sister was published.

References

External links

 Jaishree Misra
 
 On Banning Books in the Hindu newspaper
 Author TV interview at the Bangalore litfest
 Proust interview in The Hindu
 Review of Mothers & Others in the Hindustan Times
 Interview on CNN-IBN
 On Khushwant Singh

Indian women novelists
1961 births
Living people
Novelists from Delhi
21st-century Indian novelists
Women writers from Delhi
21st-century Indian women writers
People from New Delhi